Em. Bærentzen & Comp., was a leading lithography workshop and publisher based in Copenhagen, Denmark. It was founded in 1837 and merged into  in 1987 in 1874.

History

In 1843, Danchell sold Frederik Emil Winning a share of the business, and in 1845, Brentzen was bought out. When it was sold to Jens Peter Trap and printer Adolph Bull in 1856, it changed ownership once more. Trap became the sole owner of the enterprise when Bull died in 1874. He ceded it to his son who, in September 1874,  merged it into  in 1874.

Notable works
Notable works include  with text by J. P. Trap,  (in six large color prints),  published by a company,  in color, and others.
 
It began  which was later completed by I.W. Tegner & Kittendorff.

See also
 Kittendorff & Aagaard

References 

Printing companies of Denmark
Publishing companies of Denmark
Mass media companies based in Copenhagen
Danish companies established in 1837
1874 disestablishments in Denmark